Ashni Kumar Singh is a Guyanese politician. He serves as Minister of Finance . He also served in this role from September 2006 to May 2015.

Prior to his first appointment as minister, Singh was the Director of Budget in the Ministry of Finance and Deputy Auditor General in the Office of the Auditor General, as well as a chairman in the Governing Board of the Guyana Revenue Authority and the University of Guyana.

Between tenures as minister, he worked for the International Monetary Fund. As acting Minister, Singh also represented Guyana on the Boards of Governors of the IMF, the World Bank Group, the Inter-American Development Bank, and the Caribbean Development Bank.

Singh attended Queen's College, and has a PhD in Accounting and Finance from Lancaster University. He is married and has two children.

References

Living people
Year of birth missing (living people)
Place of birth missing (living people)
Government ministers of Guyana
Finance ministers of Guyana
21st-century Guyanese politicians
Alumni of Queen's College, Guyana
Alumni of Lancaster University
Alumni of Graduate College, Lancaster
People's Progressive Party (Guyana) politicians